Hal Hunter was a college football player. A native of Allen, Texas, he was a fullback for the Transylvania Pioneers in Kentucky, selected All-Southern in 1915.

References

Players of American football from Texas
People from Allen, Texas
American football fullbacks
Transylvania Pioneers football players
All-Southern college football players